Boston By Foot is a non-profit organization offering guided architectural and historical tours of Boston, Massachusetts. Founded in 1976, Boston By Foot offers daily scheduled tours from May through October. Tours are conducted by a trained corps of over 200 volunteers.  As of 2007, more than 210,000 residents and visitors from around the world have participated in Boston By Foot tours.

Regular tours

 Beacon Hill
 Boston By Little Feet - children's tour
 The Dark Side of Boston
 The Heart of the Freedom Trail
 Literary Landmarks
 The North End
 Reinventing Boston: A City Engineered
 Road to Revolution
Victorian Back Bay

Lecture Series and docent training

Each spring, Boston By Foot offers a six-week Lecture Series. Each Saturday session features a lecturer (experienced architects, historians, and engineers) as well as an afternoon field trip.  It is open to the public and required for those wishing to become a volunteer guide.

 Colonial Boston
 Federal Boston
 Victorian Boston
 Contemporary Boston
 Subterranean Boston

Awards
Boston By Foot has received several honors including: Honorary Membership, American Institute of Architects 2003; Best Tour of Boston 1999, Boston Magazine; Institute Honors, American Institute of Architects, 1996; Commonwealth Award, Boston Society of Architects, 1986; Honorary Membership, Boston Society of Architects, 1982; Editor's Pick, Yankee Magazine, 1996, 1997, 1998, 2000, 2001, 2002; Volunteer Recognition, The New England, 1997.

See also
 History of Boston, Massachusetts

References

External links
 Boston By Foot official webpage
 American Institute of Architects official website

Organizations based in Boston
Non-profit organizations based in Boston